Gordon Davies may refer to:

 Gordon Davies (footballer, born 1955), Welsh international football player
 Gordon Davies (footballer, born 1932), English football player (Chester City)
 Gordon Davies (Coronation Street), a character on the British soap opera Coronation Street